For the history of post-civil war Angola, see:

 2000s in Angola
 2010s in Angola
 2020s in Angola

History of Angola by period